The 2022 Austrian Grand Prix (officially known as the Formula 1 Rolex Großer Preis von Österreich 2022) was a Formula One motor race held on 10 July 2022 at the Red Bull Ring in Spielberg, Austria. It was the second Grand Prix weekend of the  season to utilise the Formula One sprint format.

Max Verstappen qualified on pole position and retained the first grid spot by winning the sprint race. Charles Leclerc won the race in spite of late issues with his car, retaking second place in the standings from Sergio Pérez. This race marked Leclerc's third and final win of the 2022 season and Ferrari's first win in Austria since Michael Schumacher won there for the team in 2003. Verstappen finished second, and Lewis Hamilton came in third. The entire race weekend was marred by accusations of poor fan behavior.

Background
The event was held across the weekend of the 8–10 July. It was the eleventh round of the 2022 Formula One World Championship, and the 35th running of the Austrian Grand Prix in a World Championship season.

Championship standings before the race
Max Verstappen led the Drivers' Championship by 34 points from teammate Sergio Pérez, with Charles Leclerc third, a further 9 points behind. Red Bull Racing led the Constructors' Championship, leading Ferrari by 63 points and Mercedes by 124 points.

Entrants 

The drivers and teams were the same as the season entry list with no additional stand-in drivers for the race.

Tyre choices

Tyre supplier Pirelli brought the C3, C4, and C5 tyre compounds (designated hard, medium, and soft, respectively) for teams to use at the event.

Fan harassment allegations 
During the event, some spectators accused other fans of harassment. Formula 1 teams and drivers have moved to condemn such behaviour with lifetime bans from attending F1 races in the future thought to be a possible punishment for offenders. The reported harassment received condemnation from many drivers, including Lewis Hamilton, Sebastian Vettel, and Max Verstappen. Hamilton called the abuse "disgusting" while Verstappen stated the harassment was "shocking" and should never happen. Vettel has called Formula One to ban spectators who harass other fans from attending races for life.

Practice
There were two practice sessions, each lasted one hour. The first practice session took place on 8 July 2022, 13:30 local time (UTC+02:00). The second session took place on 9 July, at 12:30 local time.

Qualifying 
The qualifying session took place on 8 July.

The first part of qualifying (Q1) saw the bottom five drivers eliminated from the rest of the session. Sebastian Vettel had his last lap time deleted, dropping him from 17th down to 20th. Daniel Ricciardo, Lance Stroll, Zhou Guanyu, Nicholas Latifi and Vettel were eliminated.

The second part of qualifying (Q2) saw the bottom five drivers eliminated from the rest of the session. Lando Norris ran wide in every attempt and did not set a representative lap time. He later explained his car was suffering from a brake problem. Pierre Gasly, Valtteri Bottas, Alexander Albon, Yuki Tsunoda and Norris were eliminated. Sergio Pérez ran wide on his last lap, with the FIA deleting his lap time after the session (as opposed to during the session, as was the practice for the other time deletions, since they failed to confirm their readings until after Q3 had already started). Despite setting times in Q3, he was reverted to his best legal Q2 lap time, demoting him to 13th.

The third part of qualifying (Q3) was a ten-car shoot-out for pole position. Lewis Hamilton spun on a fast lap, bounced across the gravel and hit the barrier. The red flag was waved and the session timer was paused as Hamilton's car was cleared. Once the session restarted, the second Mercedes of George Russell spun at turn 10 and hit the barrier, causing another red flag. Max Verstappen qualified first, with Charles Leclerc second and Carlos Sainz Jr. third. Pérez initially qualified fourth, but after his lap times were deleted, Russell was promoted into fourth and Esteban Ocon into fifth. This also meant that despite Pierre Gasly's elimination in Q2, he was promoted to tenth.

Post-qualifying
Following the qualifying session McLaren team manager Andreas Seidl admitted his team had not done a good job in qualifying after both Lando Norris and Daniel Ricciardo had their qualifying sessions affected by reliability problems. Seidl also stated that the team must also shoulder some of the blame for Ricciardo's difficulties in the season overall thus far. Mercedes boss Toto Wolff was unhappy when some fans cheered at Lewis Hamilton's crash and said the sport needed to "educate" fans on how to behave in such circumstances. Hamilton said he had no answer for what may have caused his Q3 crash and believed a top three finish in qualifying had been possible. Charles Leclerc stated after the session just wanted "a clean race" following his difficult run of results in the previous races. Christian Horner thought Sergio Pérez's punishment in regards to track limits were "very harsh," while Max Verstappen admitted he was on the edge with track limits himself in on his pole lap.

Qualifying classification 

Notes
  – Sergio Pérez originally progressed to Q3 and qualified fourth, but his fastest Q2 lap time and all lap times in Q3 were deleted for exceeding track limits during Q2.

Sprint 
The sprint took place on 9 July, and was scheduled to run for 24 laps, though this was shortened by one lap due to an aborted start procedure resulting from a stopped car.

Formation lap
Fernando Alonso was left on the grid with his wheel blankets on before the formation lap. He was wheeled back into the pit lane, but due to an electrical issue, he did not start. Zhou Guanyu had an engine issue at the end of the formation lap, this meant another formation lap was required to move Zhou's car. He managed to restart his car, completed the second formation lap and was required to start from the pit lane. Mick Schumacher, Daniel Ricciardo, George Russell, Esteban Ocon, Sergio Pérez, Lance Stroll and Sebastian Vettel were summoned to the stewards after the sprint after radio messages on the formation lap were alleged to have breach the regulation that "[drivers] must drive the car alone and unaided". All drivers were cleared as the messages were deemed to be permitted.

Sprint report
Max Verstappen retained his lead into turn one. Carlos Sainz Jr. overtook his Ferrari teammate, Charles Leclerc into turn one and subsequently attempted to overtake Verstappen into turn three, where Sainz went wide. Further back, Lewis Hamilton made contact with Pierre Gasly at turn one, sending the latter into a spin. Both cars carried on. Leclerc reovertook Sainz for second but was unable to catch Verstappen for the rest of the race.

Lando Norris attempted to overtake Alexander Albon at turn three, where Albon forced him off track, for which the FIA punished Albon with a five-second penalty. Albon was later involved in an incident with Sebastian Vettel, which saw Vettel end up in the gravel. He reversed out of the gravel and carried on but retired on lap 21 due to the collision.

Verstappen won the race, with Leclerc and Sainz in second and third. George Russell was fourth and Sergio Pérez fifth. Esteban Ocon finished sixth and Kevin Magnussen was seventh. Hamilton overtook Mick Schumacher with two laps to go for eighth, as Schumacher finished ninth. Valtteri Bottas finished tenth.

Sprint classification 

Notes
  – The sprint distance was scheduled to be completed for 24 laps before being shortened by one lap due to an aborted start procedure.
  – Valtteri Bottas finished 10th, but he was required to start the race from the back of the grid for exceeding his quota of power unit elements. He received a ten-place grid penalty for exceeding his quota of power unit elements. The penalty made no difference as he was already due to start from the back of the grid. He was later required to start the race from the pit lane due to a new rear wing assembly.
  – Zhou Guanyu qualified 18th, but he started the sprint from the pit lane due to a technical issue. His place on the grid was left vacant.
  – Alexander Albon finished 13th, but he received a five-second time penalty for forcing Lando Norris off the track.
  – Sebastian Vettel was classified as he completed more than 90% of the sprint distance.
  – Fernando Alonso did not start the sprint due to an electrics issue. His place on the grid was left vacant. He was later required to start the race from the back of the grid for exceeding his quota of power unit elements. The penalty made no difference as he was already due to start from the back of the grid.

Race 
The race was held on 10 July for 71 laps. Max Verstappen held position into turn one, as did Charles Leclerc. Carlos Sainz Jr. was challenged into turn one by George Russell, Sainz went wide, rejoined and pulled ahead of Russell before turn three. Sergio Pérez then attempted to go round the outside of Russell out of turn three. The two went side by side into turn four, where Russell's front left tyre touched Pérez's rear right tyre, spinning Pérez into the gravel. Pérez was demoted to the back, had to pit and later retired as a result of the damage. The stewards deemed that Russell was at fault and gave him a five-second penalty. He pitted to serve his penalty and change his wing, which left him in 19th, only ahead of Pérez.

Leclerc kept up with Verstappen and with DRS assistance, he passed Verstappen for the lead on lap 12. Verstappen pitted a lap later. Leclerc waited until lap 27 before he pitted, coming out behind Verstappen. By lap 33, Leclerc had caught up and passed Verstappen again. Verstappen then pitted on lap 37, but Leclerc waited until lap 49 before pitting. Like before, Leclerc had caught up to and passed Verstappen by lap 53. Sainz, who was on a similar strategy to Leclerc, was in the DRS range of Verstappen. Before Sainz could complete a move on Verstappen, Sainz's power unit failed and he was forced to retire on lap 57. A virtual safety car was deployed and both Leclerc and Verstappen pitted for new medium tyres to take them to the end.

Despite Leclerc struggling with issues with his car, he held off Verstappen and won the race. It was Leclerc's first win without starting on pole. Verstappen was second and picked up an extra point for the fastest lap. Lewis Hamilton was in third and his Mercedes teammate Russell recovered to fourth ahead of Esteban Ocon and Mick Schumacher, the latter having improved his highest Formula One finish. Lando Norris was seventh, Kevin Magnussen was eighth, and Daniel Ricciardo was ninth. Fernando Alonso finished tenth, after a last lap overtake on Valtteri Bottas. Throughout the race, Pierre Gasly, Lando Norris and Zhou Guanyu were given five-second time penalties for track limits. Gasly was given another five-second penalty after he made contact with Sebastian Vettel at turn four.

Race classification 

Notes
  – Includes one point for fastest lap.
  – Pierre Gasly received a five-second time penalty for causing a collision with Sebastian Vettel. His final position was not affected by the penalty.
  – Sebastian Vettel finished 16th, but he received a five-second time penalty for exceeding track limits.

Championship standings after the race

Drivers' Championship standings

Constructors' Championship standings

 Note: Only the top five positions are included for both sets of standings.

See also
 2022 Spielberg Formula 2 round
 2022 Spielberg Formula 3 round

Notes

References

External links

Austrian
2022
Grand Prix
Austrian Grand Prix